Swettenham is a civil parish in Cheshire East, England. It contains 12 buildings that are recorded in the National Heritage List for England as designated listed buildings.  Of these, two are listed at Grade II*, the middle of the three grades, and the others are at Grade II.  Apart from the village of Swettenham, the parish is rural.. The listed buildings consist of country houses with associated structures, a former farmhouse, a former water mill and kiln, a church, and a public house.

Key

Buildings

See also

Listed buildings in Twemlow
Listed buildings in Lower Withington
Listed buildings in Marton
Listed buildings in Somerford Booths
Listed buildings in Brereton
Listed buildings in Holmes Chapel

References
Citations

Sources

 

 

Listed buildings in the Borough of Cheshire East
Lists of listed buildings in Cheshire